Therates festivus is a species of beetle in the family Cicindelidae.

References

Cicindelidae
 
Beetles described in 1835